Nkem-Nkechukwu Ojougboh (born August 11, 1987) is Nigerian professional basketball player. He was drafted in the second round (ninth pick) at the 2010 NBA Development League Draft by the Utah Flash, an affiliate of the Utah Jazz and Atlanta Hawks. Collegiately, Ojougboh played for the Northeastern University Huskies men's basketball team from 2007-2010 and for the University of Texas San Antonio in 2005. He played for the NBA Development League team Utah Flash in the 2010/11 NBA D-League season, and for the Tulsa 66ers in 2011/12. Ojougboh was named to the CAA All-Academic First Team from 2005-2008. Ojougboh is the son of Cairo Ojougboh and Grace Ojougboh. He has two brothers Omam Ojougboh, Orieka Ojougboh and a sister Rimma Ojougboh. Out of high school, Ojougboh committed to the University of Texas at San Antonio, after also being recruited by Boise State, Cornell University, Harvard University, Arizona State University and Washington State. He transferred to Northeastern after his Freshman campaign at University of Texas San Antonio.

Collegiate career statistics

Professional career statistics

References
 http://www.nba.com/dleague/nkem_ojougboh.html
 http://www.gonu.com/news/2010/11/2/MBB_1102104713.aspx
 http://gonu.com/roster.aspx?rp_id=41
 http://www.nigeriaport.com/feature/2008/may/nigerian-athletics-spotlight-nkem-ojougboh
 http://www.azcentral.com/sports/preps/ne/articles/2008/01/16/20080116phxscottschrist.html
 http://collegebasketball.rivals.com/content.asp?CID=840769#outlook
 http://www.draftexpress.com/profile/Nkem-Ojougboh-21560/stats/

1987 births
Living people
Centers (basketball)
Nigerian men's basketball players
Northeastern Huskies men's basketball players
Sportspeople from Benin City
Tulsa 66ers players
Utah Flash players
UTSA Roadrunners men's basketball players